Dębogóra  is a village in the administrative district of Gmina Czerwonak, within Poznań County, Greater Poland Voivodeship, in west-central Poland.
It has about 100 inhabitants. The village was the birthplace of the officer of the Polish Army Jan Mikołajewski.

References

Villages in Poznań County